Anica Savić-Rebac (4 October 1892 — 7 October 1953) was a Serbian writer, classical philologist, translator, professor at the University of Belgrade. She wrote a number of essays and books about Njegoš, Goethe, Sophocles, Spinoza, Thomas Mann, Greek mystical philosophers, Plato, theory of literature. She also translated a number of works from Serbian into English, most notably The Ray of the Microcosm by Petar II Petrović-Njegoš.

Anica Savić Rebac appears under the name of Milica in travel book Black Lamb and Grey Falcon by  Rebecca West. In this book she is not only a new friend, but also the intellectual guide who eventually reveals to Rebecca West the rituals which would lead the author to the clue metaphor of her vision of the Balkans.

Works
 Geteov Helenizam (1933)
 Ljubav u filozofiji Spinozinoj (1933)
 Mistična i tragična misao kod Grka (1934)
 Štefan George (1934)
 Platonska i hrišćanska ljubav (1936)
 Kallistos (1937)
 Tomas Man i problematika naših dana (1937)
 Njegoš, Kabala i Filon
 Njegoš i bogumilstvo
 Pesnik i njeogova pozicija
  'Večeri na moru (1929)
 Predplatonska erotologija (1932),
 Antička estetika i nauka o književnosti (1954)
 Helenski vidici (1966)

Translations
 The Ray of the Microcosm (1957)
 Der Strahl des Mikrocosmos''

References

Writers from Novi Sad
Serbian women writers
Classical philologists
Women classical scholars
1892 births
1953 suicides
Suicides by firearm in Serbia
20th-century Serbian people